Raipur is an upazila in Lakshmipur District, Chittagong Division, Bangladesh. It is surrounded by the upazilas of Faridganj, Ramganj, Lakshmipur Sadar, Mehendiganj and Haimchar, and on the west by the Megna River.

Demographics
In the 2001 Bangladesh census, Raipur had a population of 236,965. Males were 51 percent of the population and females 49 percent. The population aged 18 and older was 100,491. Raipur had an average literacy rate of 22.5 percent (ages seven and older), compared to the national average of 32.4 percent. The Muslim population was 228,361; there were 8,566 Hindus, 23 Christians and 15 others.

Administration
Raipur Upazila is divided into Raipur Municipality and ten union parishads: Bamni, Char Mohana, Keroa, North Char Ababil, North Char Bangshi, Raipur, Sonapur, South Char Ababil, and South Char Bangshi. The union parishads are subdivided into 49 mauzas and 83 villages.

Raipur Municipality is subdivided into 9 wards and 15 mahallas.

Economy
Raipur has one of the largest textile factories in Bangladesh, which is closed. Its small factories are in need of modernization. Other industries include fishing, dairy farming and beef production for Eid al-Adha.

Transport

Raipur is a regional transportation hub, with bus service to major cities. Raipur upazila is connected with river port Chandpur by road. Until the establishment of Chandpur Irrigation Project (CIP) Raipur had river ways connected with Chandpur-Dhaka.Water flow in the major river Dakatia was stopped by barrage and lost water transport facilities. Three-wheeled vehicles provide local transport. Rural roads are rarely paved and poorly maintained.

Education

There are five colleges in the upazila. They include Raipur Government Degree College, founded in 1970, and Raipur Rustam Ali Degree College.

According to Banglapedia, Char Ababil Rachim Uddin High School, founded in 1914, Char Ababil SC High School (1910), and Raipur L. M. Pilot High School (1911) are notable secondary schools.

The madrasa education system includes two fazil and one kamil madrasa.

See also
Raipur Fish Hatchery and Training Center
Upazilas of Bangladesh

References

 
Upazilas of Lakshmipur District